Ellyson may refer to:

 Edgar Ellyson (1869–1954), minister
 Henry Keeling Ellyson (1923–1890), Virginia newspaperman, father of James Taylor Ellyson, grandfather of Theodore Gordon Ellyson.
 James Taylor Ellyson (1847–1919), politician
 Robert Ellyson (1615–1671), sheriff
 Theodore Gordon Ellyson (1885–1928), naval officer

See also

 Ellison
 USS Ellyson (DD-454)